Alix de Montmorency (died 24 February 1220/1221) was a French noblewoman. Her parents were Bouchard V de Montmorency and Laurette, daughter of Baldwin IV, Count of Hainaut and Alice of Namur.

Life
In 1190 Alix married Simon de Montfort (c. 1175 – 25 June 1218), who later became Earl of Leicester. She accompanied her husband on his campaigns during the Albigensian Crusade and like her husband, she was very pious. Both of them had come under the influence of Fulk of Neuilly and they were patrons of the Dominican Order.

Albigensian Crusade
Alix participated in the councils of the crusaders and recruited reinforcements in France. In 1217, she imprisoned the Jews in Toulouse. She went to the French court with Folquet de Marselha to plead for support, but she was nearby when her husband was killed as he besieged Toulouse. After this she returned to her family's estates near Paris.

Issue
Alix and Simon had:
Amaury de Montfort, 
Simon, eventually gained possession of the earldom of Leicester and played a major role in the reign of Henry III of England, initiating the Second Barons' War of 1263-1264.  
Guy, was married to Petronille, Countess of Bigorre, on 6 November 1216, but died at the siege of Castelnaudary on 20 July 1220. 
Petronilla, became an abbess at the Cistercian nunnery of St. Antoine's. Another daughter, Amicia, founded the nunnery at Montargis and died there in 1252.

References

Sources

Jonathan Sumption, The Albigensian Crusade, 2000

See also
Simon IV de Montfort

People of the Albigensian Crusade
Women in 13th-century warfare
12th-century births
1220 deaths
Women in war in France
Women in medieval European warfare
12th-century French people
12th-century French women
13th-century French people
13th-century French women